Agyneta angulata is a species of sheet weaver found in the United States and Canada. It was described by Emerton in 1882.

References

angulata
Spiders of North America
Spiders described in 1882